Arraya may be:
a Basque toponym
Arraia-Maeztu
Arraya de Oca
a Spanish (Basque) surname
Pablo Arraya
Laura Arraya
Juan José Arraya
 Vicente Arraya
Arabic  الراية ar-raya (al-raya) "the flag":
the Black Standard in Muslim Messianism
Arraya 2, an office tower in Kuwait